The White Castle Ferry was a ferry across the Mississippi River in the U.S. state of Louisiana, connecting White Castle and Carville.  It was permanently closed in June 2013 due to state budget cuts.

See also
List of crossings of the Lower Mississippi River

References

External links
Louisiana Department of Transportation and Development, Locations and Characteristics of Ferries

Ferries of the Mississippi River
Ferries of Louisiana